Big Bear City is an unincorporated community in San Bernardino County, California, United States along the east shore of Big Bear Lake and surrounded by the San Bernardino National Forest. Its population was 12,304 at the 2010 census, up from 5,779 at the 2000 census. Big Bear City is mostly residential, with smaller houses and cabins laid out in typical square block fashion. Big Bear is on the Pacific Crest Trail.

Standard Air Lines of Los Angeles began a regular airline service to the community in the summer of 1929. Its post office was founded as Van Duesen in 1927 but changed its name to Big Bear City six months later. The Big Bear City Post Office opened in 1928 and still operates.

Despite the name, Big Bear City is not an incorporated city, and should not be confused with the adjacent incorporated city of Big Bear Lake.

Etymology

Big Bear got its name due to the large number of grizzly bears that once roamed the area. Although grizzly bears went extinct in the valley at the turn of the 20th century, there are still thousands of black bears found in Big Bear Valley.

History

Pre-colonial period
The first humans to inhabit Big Bear Valley were the Serrano Indians, who trace their beginnings to Bear Valley. Serrano means mountaineers, or those of the Sierras. The Serrano people that settled much of the San Bernardino Mountains, called themselves Yuhaviatam, or: people of the pines.

It is estimated that the Serrano natives first settled in Big Bear between 1,500 and 2,000 years ago. The Serranos had both winter and summer settlements throughout the area. While their winter village was located in Lucerne Valley, they relocated to villages in the San Bernardino mountains during summer, as the altitude provided cooler temperatures. Villages were often located by rivers and lakes, however, mountain hunting camps were also established on higher elevations. Besides hunting, they also consumed pinyon nuts, mesquite beans, screw-beans, juniper berries and seeds. One of four major Serrano ethnographic sites was located in Big Bear City, called: Kayah-pia-t. Big Bear, and Lucerne Valley clans, both belonged to the same tribe: the Coyote Pervetum.

Settling here because of the region's many natural resources, they harvested acorns and herbs, but also hunted deer, rabbits, and other wildlife. A number of mortar holes can be seen in Big Bear City; these holes made by the Serranos, were utilized to ground acorns into meals. The oldest known remains of a human settlement in Big Bear Valley can be seen at the Indian Grinding Rocks in Big Bear City, called: The Eye of God, which is a sacred site to the Serrano people. The Serrano's creation narrative took place at The Eye of God, which was known as Hatauva.

The earliest known contact with European settlers in Big Bear occurred when Spanish Father Francisco Garcés arrived during his 1774-1776 expedition. Another source states, that the first contact happened in 1845 during a punitive expedition against the Native-Americans.

Geography

For statistical purposes, the United States Census Bureau has defined Big Bear City as a census-designated place (CDP).

The nearby ski resorts consist of Snow Summit and Bear Mountain.

Most of the town and the business district are centered on Big Bear Boulevard. Its limits are defined on the west by Division Road and on the east by the left turn at Highway 38, which goes to Redlands and Highway 18 which goes south to San Bernardino and north to Lucerne Valley. Though its south boundary is loosely defined by the residential boundary, the north side is defined by North Shore Road. The east-west postal divider of Big Bear City is Green Way Drive. It is here that Highway 18 (Big Bear Boulevard) turns north and crosses over to North Shore Drive heading east toward Lucerne Valley, and Highway 38 coming from the east turns north to North Shore and heads west to Big Bear Dam in the city of Big Bear Lake, California.

Sugarloaf is a large residential area that lies to the south of Big Bear City.

Demographics

2010
At the 2010 census Big Bear City had a population of 12,304. The racial makeup of Big Bear City was 10,252 (83.3%) White (75.8% Non-Hispanic White), 83 (0.7%) African American, 202 (1.6%) Native American, 103 (0.8%) Asian, 31 (0.3%) Pacific Islander, 1,089 (8.9%) from other races, and 544 (4.4%) from two or more races. There 2,323 Hispanic or Latino residents, of any race (18.9%).

The census reported that 12,286 people (99.9% of the population) lived in households, 18 (0.1%) lived in non-institutionalized group quarters, and no one was institutionalized.

There were 5,011 households, 1,546 (30.9%) had children under the age of 18 living in them, 2,435 (48.6%) were opposite-sex married couples living together, 567 (11.3%) had a female householder with no husband present, 308 (6.1%) had a male householder with no wife present.  There were 313 (6.2%) unmarried opposite-sex partnerships, and 73 (1.5%) same-sex married couples or partnerships. 1,335 households (26.6%) were one person and 450 (9.0%) had someone living alone who was 65 or older. The average household size was 2.45.  There were 3,310 families (66.1% of households); the average family size was 2.94.

The age distribution was 2,865 people (23.3%) under the age of 18, 917 people (7.5%) aged 18 to 24, 2,695 people (21.9%) aged 25 to 44, 4,060 people (33.0%) aged 45 to 64, and 1,767 people (14.4%) who were 65 or older.  The median age was 42.9 years. For every 100 females, there were 102.7 males.  For every 100 females age 18 and over, there were 100.4 males.

There were 12,226 housing units at an average density of 382.4 per square mile, of the occupied units 3,409 (68.0%) were owner-occupied and 1,602 (32.0%) were rented. The homeowner vacancy rate was 9.0%; the rental vacancy rate was 14.0%.  7,854 people (63.8% of the population) lived in owner-occupied housing units and 4,432 people (36.0%) lived in rental housing units.

According to the 2010 United States Census, Big Bear City had a median household income of $42,957, with 20.9% of the population living below the federal poverty line.

2000
At the 2000 census, there were 5,779 people in 2,290 households, including 1,603 families, in the CDP. The population density was 1,665.1 inhabitants per square mile (643.0/km). The racial makeup of the CDP was 89.1% White, 0.6% African American, 1.3% Native American, 1.5% Asian, 0.1% Pacific Islander, 3.8% from other races, and 4.7% from two or more races. Hispanic or Latino of any race were 12.9% of the population.

Of the 2,290 households 32.3% had children under the age of 18 living with them, 54.1% were married couples living together, 10.8% had a female householder with no husband present, and 30.0% were non-families. 23.6% of households were one person and 8.9% were one person aged 65 or older.  The average household size was 2.5 and the average family size was 3.0.

The age distribution was 26.5% under the age of 18, 6.9% from 18 to 24, 27.3% from 25 to 44, 25.9% from 45 to 64, and 13.3% 65 or older.  The median age was 39 years. For every 100 females, there were 98.2 males.  For every 100 females age 18 and over, there were 96.0 males.

The median household income was $35,615 and the median family income  was $42,995. Males had a median income of $33,994 versus $20,844 for females. The per capita income for the CDP was $19,301.  About 5.1% of families and 6.6% of the population were below the poverty line, including 10.6% of those under age 18 and 1.2% of those age 65 or over.

Government

Transportation
Big Bear City Airport is a general aviation airport in Big Bear City.  There are no commercial air services to this airport, although at least two airlines, including Trans World Airlines, have served Big Bear in the past.  This airport may also be used for medical evacuations, and as a base for forest-fighting aircraft when there are fires close by.  The airport is very popular with local general aviation pilots.

Wildlife
Mammals such as squirrels, chipmunks, raccoons, coyotes and skunks are commonly sighted, while black bears, mountain lions, bobcats, gray foxes and mule deer are more rarely observed.

Potentially dangerous animals include mountain lions, black bears and coyotes. A mountain lion responsible for eating a dog was killed by the sheriff in Big Bear City in 2010.

Although grizzly bears were previously common, they became extinct from Big Bear Valley in 1906.

See also
 The Eye of God
 Gold Mountain Manor

References

Further reading

External links
 KBHR Radio 93.3 FM for Big Bear news, weather and road conditions
 Big Bear Airport
 Big Bear Solar Observatory
 Big Bear Grizzly, In depth Big Bear Valley news, sports and entertainment information
 Big Bear City Magazine

Census-designated places in San Bernardino County, California
Big Bear Valley
San Bernardino Mountains
Census-designated places in California